Fury in the Slaughterhouse is a German rock band from Hanover, founded in 1987. Their hits include "Time to Wonder", "Every Generation Got Its Own Disease", "Won't Forget These Days", "Radio Orchid", "Dancing in the Sunshine of the Dark", "Milk & Honey" and "Trapped Today, Trapped Tomorrow".

The band disbanded in 2008 before reuniting in June 2013 at the Expo Plaza Festival in Hanover for only one show, and reunited again in 2017 for a nationwide tour which started with three dates at the TUI Arena, Hanover, in March. The reunited band released their latest album in 13 years, NOW in April 2021.

History 
In December 1986 the brothers Kai (vocals) and Thorsten Wingenfelder (guitar/vocals) founded the band Fury in the Slaughterhouse together with drummer Rainer Schumann, guitarist Christof Stein-Schneider and bassist Hannes Schäfer in Hanover. Keyboardist Gero Drnek joined in 1989. The band name means riot in the slaughterhouse, but according to another source it refers to the US children's series from the 1950s about a horse named Fury, which was shown on German television in the mid-1980s. Fury in the Slaughterhouse was supposed to be a mainstream rock band, which differed significantly from the punk-electronic influenced Neue Deutsche Welle movement sung in German, so all song lyrics were written in English. In 1988 the band played sold-out concerts and their first albums made it into the top 50 of the German album charts.

In 1992 their record company SPV and BMG Ariola founded the music label Slaughterhouse Music. The band now ventured live to Europe and the Anglo-American region, where they made their breakthrough in 1993 with the hits "Radio Orchid" and "Every Generation Got Its Own Disease" and the album Mono. The band opened for Meatloaf on his 1994 tour. The albums Mono and The Hearing and the Sense of Balance were released in the US with altered track lists.

In 1996, Hannes Schäfer left the band and the music industry, and was replaced by bassist Christian Decker. In 2005 the band founded the record label Kick It Out. Their earlier albums have been reissued in revised versions with additional unreleased tracks. In 2006 the band signed the city of Hanover's Golden Book.

Fury in the Slaughterhouse sold over four million albums and played at more than 1000 concerts and festivals worldwide during the band's first run.

A farewell tour through Germany took place from March until the band's planned breakup at the end of August 2008. All concerts were recorded and could be purchased on USB sticks immediately after the concert. The band's final performance in Hanover was also published as a double DVD (director: Marc Schütrumpf ) and on CD under the name Farewell & Goodbye.

In 2011 the band reunited briefly and played their hit "Won't Forget These Days" in the stadium after a home game at Hannover 96.

On 8 June 2013 the band (with guests) performed a one-off concert in Hanover ( Expo-Plaza / Messe) under the motto One City - One Band ; 25,000 visitors saw the concert.

On  10, 11 and 12 March 2017, the band celebrated their 30th anniversary with three reunion concerts in the TUI-Arena in Hanover. For the first time since the dissolution in 2008, Fury recorded a new song ("30 (It's not easy)"), which was presented on 10 March 2017 on Radio ffn and played as the opener at these concerts. They also released a new 2 CD best of called 30 - The Ultimate Best Of, which also featured an EP with "30 (It's Not Easy)" and five other new songs. Due to the successful advance sales of these three concerts, the band decided to play more concerts in Germany over the summer of 2017. According to the band's website, however, this was not the beginning of a reunion, just a show of respect to the fans.

They went on to play an acoustic tour in the fall of 2017, which was released as a double live album called Little Big World - Live & Acoustic. For this album/tour, they were joined by pedal steel guitarist Martin Huch and cellist Anne De Wolff.  The band continued their performances at large festivals in the following years, but had to cancel tour dates in spring 2020 due to the COVID-19 pandemic. In Hanover that year, however, they played two concerts on the Schützenplatz on 14 and 15 May 2020 in front of around 2000 spectators sitting in their cars as part of the so-called car culture series.

On 22 October 2020 the officially reunited band announced a new studio album titled NOW, the first in 13 years for release in April 2021. All of the band's studio albums are now available in the US, as the result of the band changing record labels to Starwatch. NOW was released on 23 April 2021, and the band will be doing outdoor shows over the coming year.

Discography

Studio albums

Singles

Videos / DVDs 
1991 – Clicksongs & Peppermint Stories (Video)
1997 – Especially Ordinary (Video)
2002 – Monochrome (Live-DVD and -Album)
2004 – Welcome to the other World – Nimby Live (DVD)

References

External links 

 Official website
 F.I.T.S. – Label

German rock music groups
German post-grunge groups
Musical groups from Hanover
Musical groups established in 1987
Musical groups disestablished in 2008
Musical groups reestablished in 2017